The Russian march is an annual demonstration in which several Russian nationalist organizations participate, many of them neo-Nazi, in several major Russian cities under the slogan "it's our country", attached to 4 November, the Day of National Unity. Among the most notable participants were the Movement Against Illegal Immigration, the main organiser of rallies, Eurasian Youth Union of Alexander Dugin, Dmitry Demushkin, the National State Party of Russia and the State Duma deputy Nikolay Kuryanovich who was excluded from the Liberal Democratic Party of Russia for his sympathy with the March. Other participants were the National Patriotic Front "Memory", the "Truth" Community, the Russian National Union, the Russian Social Movement and the "Russian Order" Movement led by Vasily Ansimov.

Background
The first Russian March took place on 4 November 2005 and was the first legal far-right mass meeting in modern Russian history. Both rallies have been inspired by expulsion of Polish-Lithuanian forces from the Moscow Kremlin during the Russo-Polish War of 1605–1618 on 22 October O.S. (4 November N.S.), which was subsequently marked by the tsar  in 1612 as a feast day. The preparations for 2006 March have been launched by the Action Against Illegal Immigration and Eurasian Youth Union. Due to this the march has had two different names and two different schedules.

2006 Russian march

Besides Moscow, the March was planned in Saint Petersburg, Krasnoyarsk, Novosibirsk, Chita, Stavropol, Maykop, Tyumen, Vladivostok, Yuzhno-Sakhalinsk, Blagoveshchensk, Nizhniy Novgorod and Kaliningrad, but was banned in the majority of cities as well. Irkutsk officially allowed the March. The rallies took place also in Ukraine (Kyiv, Crimea, Odessa, Sevastopol), Moldova (Chișinău, Tiraspol) and Georgia (Tbilisi). The Heads of Russian Youth of Moldova and Eurasian Youth Union of the Republic of Moldova have been arrested. Even though the use of Nazi symbols was prohibited by the organizers, a flag with conventionalized swastika was raised by the Head of SS-Slavic Union Dmitriy Demushkin in Moscow.

Banning the march in Moscow, mayor Yuriy Luzhkov said: "If we allow our state to be split on ethnic or interconfessional grounds, if we allow religious wars, then I am afraid this will be the end of Russia." A counter-protest in Moscow by left-wing demonstrators drew about 500 people carrying banners with slogans such as "Russian Anti-Fascist Front" and "I am Russian and therefore not a fascist." The Russian March was also opposed by the Moscow Bureau for Human Rights and Russian Jewish community headed by rabbi Berel Lazar. Krasnoyarsk youth organizations "Together!", "Krasnoyarsk Regional Student Squads", "Krasnoyarsk Youth Forum", "Yenisey Patriots" and "Youth Guards of United Russia" have prepared a written appeal to Governor of Krasnoyarsk Oblast Alexander Khloponin and city mayor Pyotr Pimashkov to prevent holding of Russian March in the city. However the Movement Against Illegal Immigration  told Reuters it would go ahead with their gatherings regardless of whether they were authorized or not.

The 2006 Russian march was banned by city mayor Yuriy Luzhkov on 31 October. Despite condemning the xenophobic nature of The March, the Deputy Chief of the Moscow branch of Yabloko Alexey Navalny advocated for the permission of the event in the framework of freedom of assembly.

A separate mass-meeting called the Right March have been organized by several Orthodox movements (the National Council, the Orthodox Standard Bearers Union and The Bastion), which declared their independent intentions.

2017 Russian march
In the 2017 the Russian march, in Lyublino District, participants are reported to include several far-right organizations, such as Nationalist Party, Black Bloc led by Vladimir (Ratnikov) Komarnitsky, Nation and Freedom Committee (KNS) led by Vladimir Burmistrov and Roman Kovalyov. At the beginning of the event, some far-right activists, addressing reporters, told that the police wanted to prevent them from participating in the march, because of the symbols they were wearing. For this reason, several demonstrators broke away from the march and tried to improvise a new march on Belorechenskaya street, and they were quickly arrested along with other passersby, in the confusion. During these detentions the police threw a far-right militant from the Russian Human Rights Defense League, knocking her unconscious. The march continued towards the Bratislavskaya Metro station and also Konstantin Filin was also detained after the far-right demonstrators shouted anti-police slogans. At the metro station several nationalist leaders made speeches from the stage, during which they talked about the repression suffered by the far right in Russia. Ivan Noviopov of the Irreconcilable League called for a "white revenge", unfurling a Confederate flag. Andrei Narodny of the National-Revolutionary Vanguard (NRA) closed his speech with a fascist salute.

2020 Russian march
Authorities of the Russian Federation denied authorization for the 2020 Russian march due to the COVID-19 pandemic. Despite the ban, dozens of nationalists gathered in a Siberian city of Barnaul on November 4, protesting against President Vladimir Putin. The organizers of the Russian march in Moscow, following the refusal, planned to lay flowers at the Federal Penitentiary Service office, to commemorate Russian neo-Nazi Maxim Martsinkevich, who died in prison one month before. The Moscow police detained at least 32 of far-right activists.

References

External links
 RusMarsh.org, official site

Protests in Russia
Protests in Ukraine
Protests in Moldova
Russian March
March
Russian March
Russian March
Russian March
Xenophobia in Europe
November events